Pseudoakuammigine is a bio-active alkaloid from Alstonia boonei, a medicinal tree from West Africa.

Further reading
A Review of the Ethnobotany and Pharmacological Importance of Alstonia boonei De Wild (Apocynaceae)

References

Tryptamine alkaloids
Quinolizidine alkaloids
Alkaloids found in plants
Heterocyclic compounds with 6 rings
Methyl esters
Tetrahydropyrans